Kwai Chung Estate is a public housing estate in Kwai Chung, New Territories, Hong Kong. It is the largest public housing estate in Kwai Tsing District and consists of sixteen residential buildings completed between 1997 and 2008.

History
The phase 1 and phase 3–5 of its redevelopment were completed progressively in 1997, 2000 and 2005. Starting from 1993, the Housing Department has embarked on the redevelopment of Kwai Chung Estate. After 12 years of work, the entire redevelopment project was realised in 2005. Being the largest public housing estate in Hong Kong, Kwai Chung Estate provides 11,759 rental flats for about 33,300 people. The redevelopment works also include realignment of Sheung Kok Street, road improvement works and the allocation of 800 flats in Kwai Fuk Court for government quarters. It features commercial centre, carpark, public transport interchange, post office, social welfare and recreational facilities. Pak Kwai House and Hop Kwai House were built of the site of the former Kwai Chung Factory Estate.

Kwai Chung Estate was the location of a COVID related lockdown in January 2022 due to the Omicron variant. 2700 residents were placed under the 5-7 day lockdown, and 447 infections have been confirmed.

Houses

Demographics
According to the 2016 by-census, Kwai Chung Estate had a population of 38,674. The median age was 40.7 and the majority of residents (98 per cent) were of Chinese ethnicity. The average household size was 2.8 people. The median monthly household income of all households (i.e. including both economically active and inactive households) was HK$19,370.

Politics
For the 2019 District Council election, the estate fell within two constituencies. Most of the estate is located in the Kwai Chung Estate South constituency, which was formerly represented by Ivan Wong Yun-tat until May 2021, while the remainder of the estate falls within the Kwai Chung Estate North constituency, which was represented by Simon Leung Kam-wai until November 2021.

See also

Public housing estates in Kwai Chung

References

Residential buildings completed in 1997
Residential buildings completed in 2000
Residential buildings completed in 2005
Residential buildings completed in 2008
Kwai Chung
Public housing estates in Hong Kong